Stannards is a hamlet (and census-designated place) located in the towns of Willing and Wellsville in Allegany County, New York, United States. The population was 798 at the 2010 census. The hamlet is named after early resident John Stannard.

History 
The hamlet was originally called "Stannards Corners."  John Stannard built the first hotel in this community.  The hotel was later owned by Clark Hayes, whose son, film star George "Gabby" Hayes was born in it.

Geography
Stannards is located on the boundary between the towns of Willing and Wellsville. Its center is located at  (42.083345, -77.922434).

The Genesee River flows northward through the town. North of the hamlet, Chenunda Creek joins the river from the east.

The hamlet is located on New York Routes 19, a major north–south trunk road, and 248, a local east–west trunk road.

Demographics

As of the census of 2000, there were 868 people, 375 households, and 260 families residing in the community. The population density was 305.1 per square mile (118.0/km2). There were 436 housing units at an average density of 153.3/sq mi (59.3/km2). The racial makeup of the CDP was 98.50% White, 0.35% Native American, 0.35% Asian, 0.23% from other races, and 0.58% from two or more races. Hispanic or Latino of any race were 0.46% of the population.

There were 375 households, out of which 27.5% had children under the age of 18 living with them, 51.7% were married couples living together, 11.7% had a female householder with no husband present, and 30.4% were non-families. 26.7% of all households were made up of individuals, and 12.0% had someone living alone who was 65 years of age or older. The average household size was 2.31 and the average family size was 2.72.

In the hamlet the population was spread out, with 23.2% under the age of 18, 8.4% from 18 to 24, 22.2% from 25 to 44, 29.4% from 45 to 64, and 16.8% who were 65 years of age or older. The median age was 42 years. For every 100 females, there were 100.0 males. For every 100 females age 18 and over, there were 97.9 males.

The median income for a household in the hamlet was $37,344, and the median income for a family was $46,136. Males had a median income of $41,000 versus $20,865 for females. The per capita income for the area was $18,575. About 5.4% of families and 10.7% of the population were below the poverty line, including 9.2% of those under age 18 and 4.3% of those age 65 or over.

Notable person
 Gabby Hayes, American radio, film, and television actor

References

Census-designated places in New York (state)
New York (state) populated places on the Genesee River
Hamlets in New York (state)
Census-designated places in Allegany County, New York
Hamlets in Allegany County, New York